Egbert Ho (born March 20, 1978) is a former field hockey midfielder from the Netherlands, who earned a total number of sixteen caps for the Dutch national team in 2004 under coach Terry Walsh. Ho played club hockey for HC Klein Zwitserland in The Hague.

External links
 Dutch Hockey Federation

1978 births
Living people
Dutch male field hockey players
Delft University of Technology alumni
Place of birth missing (living people)
HC Klein Zwitserland players
20th-century Dutch people